Logania regina is a butterfly in the family Lycaenidae. It was described by Herbert Druce in 1873. It is found in the Indomalayan realm.

Subspecies
 Logania regina regina (Malaysia, Borneo, Philippines: Sula Islands)
 Logania regina sriwa Distant, 1886 (Sumatra, southern Burma, Thailand)

References

External links
Logania at Markku Savela's Lepidoptera and Some Other Life Forms

Logania (butterfly)
Butterflies described in 1873
Butterflies of Asia
Taxa named by Herbert Druce